Varignana is an hamlet located on the hills of the Bolognese Apennines in the comune of Castel San Pietro Terme in the Metropolitan City of Bologna.

History 
The first documents attesting to the existence of the village of Vargnano date back to the year 1000. However the birth of the original village seems to be earlier than a few centuries. The construction of Varignana in fact would have been due to the destruction of the nearby Roman city of Claternae, which occurred around the fifth century.

To date the oldest buildings still remained intact in Varignana are the crypt, in the Church of San Lorenzo, the ruins of the access casserro and the south-west tower. In fact with the bombings of the Second World War almost all the houses were destroyed.

Transports 

References 

Metropolitan City of Bologna